is Latin for absence.  , a legal term, is Latin for "in the absence" or "while absent".

 may also refer to:

 Award in absentia
 Declared death in absentia, or simply, death in absentia, legally declared death without a body
 Election in absentia
 Excommunication in absentia
 Graduation in absentia
 In absentia health care, the provision of healthcare in the absence of a personal contact
 Trial in absentia

Music, films and television 
 In Absentia (film), a 2000 short film commissioned by the BBC
 In Absentia, a 2002 album by Porcupine Tree
 Absentia (film), a 2011 horror film
 "In Absentia" (Fringe), a 2012 episode of the television series Fringe
 Absentia (TV series), a 2017 television series